Question of Sport (previously A Question of Sport) is a British television sports quiz show produced and broadcast by the BBC. It is the "world's longest running TV sports quiz". Following a pilot episode in December 1968, broadcast only in the north of England, the series has run since 1970 (except 1973 and 1978) and celebrated its 50th anniversary in 2020. It is  currently presented  by Paddy McGuinness, with team captains Sam Quek and Ugo Monye.

History

First edition
The first edition of A Question of Sport was broadcast on 5 January 1970. Presenter David Vine was joined by captains Henry Cooper and Cliff Morgan. The teams were composed of George Best, Lillian Board, Tom Finney, and Ray Illingworth.

40th anniversary
On 8 January 2010, the BBC broadcast a 40th anniversary special. Joining Sue Barker, Matt Dawson, and Phil Tufnell, were Pat Cash, David Coulthard, Laura Davies, and Michael Johnson.

2012 Summer Olympics specials
Following the 2012 Summer Olympics, A Question of Sport aired two special editions featuring champions from the aforementioned Olympics.

Gold Medal Winners special
On 1 September 2012, Katherine Grainger and Jason Kenny were among the gold medal winners featured.

2012 Olympics special
On 29 September 2012, Tim Baillie, Jade Jones, Laura Kenny, Greg Rutherford, and Etienne Stott partook.

1,000th episode
On 4 March 2013, A Question of Sport marked its 1,000th episode. Each captain was joined by two former captains.  Dawson was joined by Willie Carson and John Parrott, while Tufnell was joined by Bill Beaumont and Ally McCoist. Tufnell's team won.

2016 Summer Olympics specials
Shortly after the 2016 Summer Olympics, A Question of Sport held two special editions featuring champions from the above-mentioned Olympics.

The Olympic Champions special
On 7 September 2016, the Olympic Champions special featured gold medal winners, including Callum Skinner.

Gold Rush special
On 14 September 2016, for a Gold Rush special, A Question of Sport were joined by Maddie Hinch, Jason and Laura Kenny, and Sam Quek.

50th anniversary

A Question of Sport at 50
On 27 December 2019, the BBC aired a documentary that looked back on the programme's history. As well as looking back through the archives, A Question of Sport at 50 saw a number of sportspeople recount their memories, these included: Jessica Ennis-Hill, Colin Jackson, and Denise Lewis. Presenter Sue Barker and captains Matt Dawson and Phil Tufnell also shared their experiences.

50 Not Out
On 3 January 2020, Sue Barker presented a 50th anniversary special. Matt Dawson captained a team composed of Laura Davies and Beth Tweddle, while Phil Tufnell led Ally McCoist and Martin Offiah. Dawson's team won, the 1,255th episode, by 19 points to 16.

Theme tune
There have been 4 theme tunes over the years. A theme was introduced in the mid-1980s and has been remixed and updated a few times since. The current mix was introduced on 3 September 2021.

Rounds
The rounds regularly played during series 48, include:

Picture Board
Twelve numbered squares each reveal a sportsperson to be identified during this one minute round.

One Minute Round
Each team is asked nine questions in 60 seconds.

Sports Action
Contestants are asked questions about a montage of sporting action.

Observation Round
Sports action is shown and contestants are asked questions about details of what they have just seen, e.g. "What colour hat was a certain person wearing?" or "How many balls were there?"

Mystery Guest
Each team tries to identify a sportsperson in unfamiliar circumstances and using unconventional camera angles.

Home or Away
Each contestant can answer a one-point "home question" on the sport they participate or participated in or can answer an "away question" on a different sport for up to three points—away questions require three answers, a point per correct answer.

Buzzer Round
The teams play head-to-head, answering as many questions as possible in 60 seconds. At this point, the round immediately ends, even if each presenter is halfway through asking a question.

Sprint Finish
The captains have 60 seconds to act out up to ten sporting terms for the remaining members of the team to guess.

Presenters and captains

Current presenter and captains
The current presenter is Paddy McGuinness, taking over in 2021. The current captains, also coming in 2021, are Ugo Monye and Sam Quek. Ugo Monye is a former rugby union international, winning 14 caps for England. He played club rugby for Harlequins and also played for the British & Irish Lions. Sam Quek is a former field hockey international, who won gold as part of the Great Britain women's national field hockey team at the 2016 Summer Olympics. Quek is the first female team captain on A Question of Sport.

Former presenters
The 1968 pilot episode, broadcast only in the north of England, was hosted by Stuart Hall. The first series was broadcast nationally from January 1970, with David Vine at the helm for the first seven series. David Coleman succeeded Vine—remaining as presenter until 1997. Vine returned to the series as a guest host in 1989, presenting the final five episodes of series 18 in Coleman's absence. Sue Barker presented A Question of Sport from 1997 until 2021. Sue Barker won the 1976 French Open tennis tournament and reached a World Ranking of 3.

Former captains
A Question of Sport's first captains were boxer Henry Cooper and rugby union player Cliff Morgan. Over the history of the show, some captains have had long tenures, these include: rugby union player Bill Beaumont making 319 appearances and footballer Ally McCoist making 363 appearances. The show's longest serving captain is Matt Dawson who appeared in the show for 17 years from 2004 to 2021.

Former captains, include:

4 rugby union players:
Bill Beaumont (1982–1996), Matt Dawson (2004–2021), Gareth Edwards (1979–1982), and Cliff Morgan (1970–1975)

3 cricketers:
Ian Botham (1988–1996), Fred Trueman (1976) and Phil Tufnell (2008–2021)

2 jockeys:
Willie Carson (1982–1984) and Frankie Dettori (2002–2004)

2 footballers:
Emlyn Hughes (1979–1982, 1984–1988) and Ally McCoist (1996–2007)

1 boxer:
Henry Cooper (1970-1977) and (1979)

1 long-distance runner:
Brendan Foster (1977–1979)

1 snooker player:
John Parrott (1996–2002)

Guest captains
Over the years there have been several guest captains standing in for one of the regulars when they have other commitments. Following Ally McCoist's departure, several guests, including Phil Tufnell, sat in the captain's chair before Tufnell was eventually selected as McCoist's permanent replacement:

 Bobby Moore, footballer (1968, 1970, 1972 and 1974)
 Johnny Haynes, footballer (1970)
 Bobby Charlton, footballer (1972 and 1974–75)
 Mary Peters, athlete (1976)
 Alan Pascoe, athlete (1976)
 John Barnes, footballer (1992)
 Roger Black, track and field athlete (1992)
 John Parrott, snooker (1992)
 Ally McCoist, footballer (1996)
 Will Carling, rugby union player (1996)
 Sam Torrance, golfer (1997–98 and 2003)
 Rob Wainwright, rugby union player (1997)
 Jonathan Davies, rugby union player (1998)
 David Ginola, footballer (2000)
 Matthew Pinsent, rower (2003)
 Alan Hansen, footballer (2003)
 Neil Ruddock, footballer (2003–04) 
 Michael Owen, footballer (2004)
 David Seaman, footballer (2004)
 Matt Dawson, rugby union player (2004)
 Bill Beaumont, rugby union player (2004)
 Tim Henman, tennis player (2004)
 Jamie Redknapp, footballer (2007)
 Shane Warne, cricketer (2007)
 Darren Gough, cricketer (2007)
 Phil Tufnell, cricketer (2007)
 Ricky Hatton, boxer (2007) 
 Dennis Taylor, snooker (2008)
 Gary Speed, footballer (2008)
 Graeme Swann, cricketer (2014)
 Michael Vaughan, cricketer (2014)
 Robbie Savage, footballer (2014)
 Greg Rutherford, track and field athlete (2015)

Notable moments
 Emlyn Hughes during a 1987 Picture Board identifying Princess Anne as John Reid.
 Princess Anne appearing on the 200th edition of the programme, shortly after being identified as John Reid.
 Ally McCoist not being able to identify himself as a show jumper in a clip.
 Frankie Dettori "struggling to unscramble" an anagram of Frankie Dettori.
 Ally McCoist not being able to "recognise his Rangers boss at the time:" Walter Smith.
 During Mystery Guest rounds, Sue Barker has been guessed as Ray Clemence, Chris Hoy, Alan Minter, and Dennis Taylor.
 Paul O'Connell correctly guessing Borussia Monchengladbach after two letters.
 John Parrott getting beat to the buzzer by Matt Dawson on a question about Snooker in a January 1999 episode. The question was: "In which sport would you use a spider?" John was so embarrassed by this, he stood in the audience for a brief moment.

Transmissions

Spin-offs

The A Question of Sport format has been applied to various other areas of knowledge. The following spin-off series were all made by the BBC:

A Question of News, presented by Richard Baker, 1971, Katharine Whitehorn and Brian Redhead were the team captains

A Question of Entertainment, presented by Tom O'Connor, 1988, Ken Dodd and Larry Grayson were the team captains. The show was reformatted and retitled That's Showbusiness and was broadcast under this title from 1989 to 1996.

A Question of Pop, presented by Jamie Theakston, 2000–01 which used the same graphics and set as the Sport version but different colours. Noddy Holder (Tony Hadley in episode 1) and Suggs were the team captains

A Question of TV, presented by Gaby Roslin, 2001, Lorraine Kelly and Rowland Rivron were the team captains

A Question of Sport: Super Saturday with Jason Manford in 2014 on BBC One

Roslin also hosted a one-off special, A Question of EastEnders, in 2000. Another one-off special, "A Question of Comedy" was to have been aired on 16 March 2007 as a part of Comic Relief 2007, but after a scandal involving contestant Jade Goody it was replaced with a special edition of Top Gear.

A Question of Spit was a short segment aired in 1988 as part of the inaugural Red Nose Day telethon, featuring Daley Thompson, Barry McGuigan and Mike Gatting forming a team, with their opponents being their own Spitting Image puppets, captained by an Emlyn Hughes puppet.  The quiz was hosted by the Spitting Image puppet of David Coleman, with the real Coleman and the puppet Steve Davis also making an appearance.

On 21 March 2012, One Media Radio's Final Whistle produced a one off end of year special entitled, Final Quizzle: Final Whistle does A Question of Sport. Presented by Barry Landy, the show featured two teams consisting of Stuart Hodge, Rory Wilde, Phil Peacock, Steve Sanders, Ben Mouncer and Lewis Davies and included rounds such as 'Tiger's Eighteen Holes' and 'Whelan or Fortune'.

In November 2012, One Media Radio's Head of Sport Edmund Doc Crosthwaite confirmed that Final Quizzle would return for a one off Christmas special on 12 December 2012.

A Question of Sport Relief is a special version of the show usually presented by a guest presenter on Sport Relief night since 2002. The 2002, 2004 and 2006 versions were hosted by Stephen Fry. 2008's version was hosted by Jimmy Carr after Fry had to pull out having broken his arm.

BBC One Scotland aired a one-off A Question of Scotland as part of Children in Need 2008, with Jackie Bird as quizmaster.

The CBBC programme Dick and Dom in da Bungalow made a parody called  A Question of Muck as part of the creamy muck muck grand finale game.

The CBBC programme  The Saturday Show did a segment called A Question of Busted. Featured the band Busted answering questions about themselves, it was presented by Fearne Cotton who in each segment was dressed as Sue Barker.

In popular culture
The What Happened Next? round was spoofed in an episode of A Bit of Fry & Laurie as David Coleman (Fry) asks Emlyn Hughes (Laurie) to guess what happened after the action stopped in the previous sketch.  The host's refusal to confirm whether the given answer is correct then leads into another round of the game, with the question of what happened following the original What Happened Next? sketch.

The show was one of many British TV shows reinterpreted by Chanel 9, a recurring sketch on The Fast Show, where it was titled Questo Sporta and featured the mystery guest round.

References

External links
 
 
 
 

1968 British television series debuts
1960s British game shows
1960s British sports television series
1970s British game shows
1970s British sports television series
1980s British game shows
1980s British sports television series
1990s British game shows
1990s British sports television series
2000s British game shows
2000s British sports television series
2010s British game shows
2010s British sports television series
2020s British game shows
2020s British sports television series
BBC panel games
BBC television game shows
British panel games
English-language television shows
Lost BBC episodes
Television series by BBC Studios